The 2013 African Fencing Championships were held in Cape Town, South Africa from 25 to 29 June.

Medal summary

Men's events

Women's events

Medal table

References
 Annual Report 2012–13 of the International Fencing Federation

2013
African Fencing Championships
International fencing competitions hosted by South Africa
African Fencing Championships
African Fencing Championships